Ryan Michael Brooke (born 4 October 1990) is an English football forward.

Career 
On 2 May 2009, Brooke was handed his league debut against Walsall in Oldham's final game of the 2008–09 season. After being named as a substitute, he came on in the 71st minute for Danny Whitaker. In the 74th minute, he scored with his first touch of the ball, the winning goal in the 2–1 victory.
He studied at the same school in Holmes Chapel as Seth Johnson and Dean Ashton.

In September 2011 he joined Barrow on a months loan, and played in 6 League games. However Oldham manager Paul Dickov informed Brooke that he still had a future at the club.

On the January transfer window deadline day of 2012, Brooke signed for Conference Premier side AFC Telford United on a one-month loan deal.

He was released by Oldham at the end of the 2011–12 season, along with eight other players.

He joined Altrincham in May 2012. He scored his first goal for Altrincham, a penalty, in a 6–0 win over Hinckley United.

In August 2016 he signed for Nantwich Town and scored on his debut for the club the following day.

Career statistics

References

External links 
 
 Ryan Brooke profile at OldhamAthletic.co.uk
 

1990 births
Living people
English footballers
Association football forwards
Oldham Athletic A.F.C. players
Barrow A.F.C. players
English Football League players
People from Holmes Chapel
National League (English football) players
AFC Telford United players
Altrincham F.C. players
Sportspeople from Cheshire
Curzon Ashton F.C. players
Nantwich Town F.C. players
Mossley A.F.C. players